Chicolete Creek is a stream in the U.S. state of Texas.

Chicolete is a name derived from Spanish meaning "chocolate".

See also
List of rivers of Texas

References

Rivers of DeWitt County, Texas
Rivers of Jackson County, Texas
Rivers of Lavaca County, Texas
Rivers of Victoria County, Texas
Rivers of Texas